Radical 22 or radical right open box meaning "box" is one of the 23 Kangxi radicals (214 radicals total) composed of two strokes.

In the Kangxi Dictionary, there are 64 characters (out of 49,030) to be found under this radical.

In Traditional Chinese used in Taiwan, Hong Kong and Macau, radical 22 (right open box), whose two strokes share the same starting point, is slightly different from radical 23 (hiding enclosure), whose second stroke starts is a bit right to the starting point of the first stroke.

In mainland China, the two radicals were unified as right open box , which then became the 8th indexing component in Table of Indexing Chinese Character Components predominantly adopted by Simplified Chinese dictionaries, and the nuance between the two radicals no longer exists; No associated indexing component is left after the merger. This merger also applies to Traditional Chinese characters in China's GB character set.

Radical 22 and radical 23 were also unified in Japanese kanji. JIS character set (including kyūjitai). Mainstream Japanese fonts and dictionaries do not distinguish between the two radicals.

Evolution

An archaic version of this radical, directly regularized from the bronzeware and seal scripts forms, occasionally appears in regular script (kaishu) or printed text as 𠥓 (12 strokes, 匚 + 10 strokes, e.g., 𠥧, an archaic version of 杯) and is used for the transcription of ancient inscriptions.

Derived characters

Literature

References

External links

Unihan Database - U+531A

022
008